is a railway station on the Ainokaze Toyama Railway Line in the city of Kurobe, Toyama, Japan, operated by the third-sector railway operator Ainokaze Toyama Railway.

Lines

Station layout 
Ikuji Station has two opposed ground-level side platforms connected by a footbridge. The station is staffed.

Platforms

History

Ikuji Station was opened on 16 April 1910. From this date, Ikuji Station was transferred to the ownership of the third-sector operating company Ainokaze Toyama Railway.

Adjacent stations

Passenger statistics
In fiscal 2015, the station was used by an average of 471 passengers daily (boarding passengers only).

Surrounding area 
 YKK Kurobe factory

See also
 List of railway stations in Japan

References

External links

  

Railway stations in Toyama Prefecture
Railway stations in Japan opened in 1910
Ainokaze Toyama Railway Line
Kurobe, Toyama